Blanchester is a village in Clinton and Warren counties in the U.S. state of Ohio. The population was 4,224 at the 2020 census. Blanchester is part of the Wilmington, Ohio Micropolitan Statistical Area, which is also included in the Cincinnati-Wilmington-Maysville, OH-KY-IN Combined Statistical Area.

History
Blanchester was laid out in 1832 by Joseph and John Blancett, and named for them. 

In March of 2020, the historic Bindley Block building burnt down.

Geography
Blanchester is located at  (39.292314, -83.985769).

There is no other community named "Blanchester" in the world.

Demographics

2010 census
As of the census of 2010, there were 4,243 people, 1,636 households, and 1,113 families living in the village. The racial makeup of the village was 97.8% White, 0.4% African American, 0.3% Native American, 0.3% Asian, and 1.1% from two or more races. Hispanic or Latino of any race were 0.4% of the population.

There were 1,636 households, of which 34.8% had children under the age of 18 living with them, 47.9% were married couples living together, 14.4% had a female householder with no husband present, 5.7% had a male householder with no wife present, and 32.0% were non-families. 27.8% of all households were made up of individuals, and 11.9% had someone living alone who was 65 years of age or older. The average household size was 2.53 and the average family size was 3.08.

The median age in the village was 37.3 years. 25.5% of residents were under the age of 18; 8.1% were between the ages of 18 and 24; 26.4% were from 25 to 44; 24.5% were from 45 to 64; and 15.6% were 65 years of age or older. The gender makeup of the village was 47.1% male and 52.9% female.

2000 census

As of the census of 2000, there were 4,220 people, 1,645 households, and 1,131 families living in the village. The population density was 1,424.8 people per square mile (550.5/km2). There were 1,766 housing units at an average density of 596.3 per square mile (230.4/km2). The racial makeup of the village was 98.70% White, 0.14% African American, 0.17% Native American, 0.36% Asian, 0.02% from other races, and 0.62% from two or more races. Hispanic or Latino of any race were 0.62% of the population.

There were 1,645 households, out of which 35.0% had children under the age of 18 living with them, 53.2% were married couples living together, 12.0% had a female householder with no husband present, and 31.2% were non-families. 27.8% of all households were made up of individuals, and 14.4% had someone living alone who was 65 years of age or older. The average household size was 2.49 and the average family size was 3.05.

In the village, the population was spread out, with 27.1% under the age of 18, 8.5% from 18 to 24, 27.3% from 25 to 44, 20.5% from 45 to 64, and 16.6% who were 65 years of age or older. The median age was 36 years. For every 100 females there were 85.6 males. For every 100 females age 18 and over, there were 80.9 males.

The median income for a household in the village was $35,608, and the median income for a family was $42,018. Males had a median income of $32,088 versus $24,531 for females. The per capita income for the village was $17,112. About 6.9% of families and 11.0% of the population were below the poverty line, including 12.4% of those under age 18 and 21.1% of those age 65 or over.

Economy
As of 2015, Blanchester Showplace Cinemas was reported as having the cheapest first run movie theater seating in America.

Education
Blanchester Local School District consists of Putman Elementary School, an Intermediate School, Middle School & High School. The mascot is the Blanchester Wildcat. Blanchester Schools are known for academic excellence. Blanchester High School currently holds a "Bronze" national rating by U.S. News & World Report.

Blanchester has a lending library, the Blanchester Public Library.

Notable people
 Clarence J. Brown - newspaper publisher, member of the United States House of Representatives, Lieutenant Governor of Ohio, and Ohio Secretary of State
 Clarence J. "Bud" Brown Jr. - newspaper publisher, member of the United States House of Representatives, and Secretary of Commerce
 Frank M. Casto, orthodontist and Past President of AAO and ADA
 Cooper Snyder, businessman and politician

References

External links

Villages in Clinton County, Ohio
Villages in Warren County, Ohio
Villages in Ohio
Populated places established in 1832
1832 establishments in Ohio